Lecanora loekoesii is a species of corticolous (bark-dwelling), crustose lichen in the family Lecanoraceae. Found in South Korea, it was formally described as a new species in 2011 by Lei Lü, Yogesh Joshi, and Jae-Seoun Hur. It is only known to occur at the type locality. The specific epithet loekoesii honours Hungarian lichenologist László Lőkös, who collected the type specimen.

Description
The lichen forms a thin, grey, crust-like thallus that lacks soredia, pruina, and a prothallus. Its asci contains from 12 to 16 ascospores, each of which are ellipsoid, hyaline, and typically measure 12.6–15.3 by 7.5–8.5 μm. It contains several secondary chemicals, including atranorin, usnic acid, zeorin, and norstictic acid.

See also
List of Lecanora species

References

loekoesii
Lichen species
Lichens described in 2011
Lichens of Asia